Psalm 142 is the 142nd psalm of the biblical Book of Psalms in the Masoretic text and modern numbering, part of the final Davidic collection of psalms, comprising Psalms 138 to 145, which are specifically attributed to David in their opening verses. It is labelled as a maschil or contemplation. In the Latin Vulgate, it is an oratio or prayer.

The text is presented as a prayer uttered by David at the time he was hiding in the Cave of Adullam (part of the David and Jonathan narrative in the Books of Samuel). Albert Barnes notes that "a prayer when he was in the cave" could mean it was a prayer which he composed while in the cave, or one which he composed at a later date, "putting into a poetic form the substance of the prayer which he breathed forth there". It is, consequently, used as a prayer in times of distress.

In the slightly different numbering system used in the Greek Septuagint version of the Bible, and in the Latin Vulgate/Vulgata Clementina, this psalm is Psalm 141.

Text

Hebrew Bible version
Following is the Hebrew text of Psalm 142:

King James Version
The following is the English text of the Psalm from the King James Bible.
 Maschil of David; A Prayer when he was in the cave.
 I cried unto the LORD with my voice; with my voice unto the LORD did I make my supplication.
 I poured out my complaint before him; I shewed before him my trouble.
 When my spirit was overwhelmed within me, then thou knewest my path. In the way wherein I walked have they privily laid a snare for me.
 I looked on my right hand, and beheld, but there was no man that would know me: refuge failed me; no man cared for my soul.
 I cried unto thee, O LORD: I said, Thou art my refuge and my portion in the land of the living.
 Attend unto my cry; for I am brought very low: deliver me from my persecutors; for they are stronger than I.
 Bring my soul out of prison, that I may praise thy name: the righteous shall compass me about; for thou shalt deal bountifully with me.

Verse numbering
In the Hebrew Bible, Psalm 142:1 comprises the designation
Maschil of David; A Prayer when he was in the cave. (KJV)
From then on verses 1–7 in most English versions correspond to verses 2–8 in the Hebrew text.

Verse 2
I pour out my complaint before Him;I declare before Him my trouble.Barnes points out that the psalmist is not so much "complaining" as meditating, or praying for release.

Liturgical use

In Catholic liturgy, this psalm (also known by its Latin incipit Voce mea ad Dominum clamavi) has been recited at Vespers since the Middle Ages. According to the Rule of St. Benedict (530), this psalm traditionally appeared on Friday night.Psautier latin-français du bréviaire monastique, p. 528, 1938/2003. In the current Liturgy of the Hours, this psalm is recited on Saturday Vespers in the first week of the cycle of four weeks. Psalm 142 is said or sung at Evensong on the 29th of the month following the rubrics of the Book of Common Prayer. This psalm is known to have been recited by Saint Francis of Assisi on his deathbed.

Musical settings
Artemy Vedel composed a choral concerto based on the Psalm 142, Glasom moim''. Polyphonic settings of the psalm have been composed by Andreas Hakenberger, Gracián Babán, and Jules Van Nuffel, among others.

Notes

References

External links

 in Hebrew and English - Mechon-mamre
 

142
Works attributed to David